Zandeweer is a village in Het Hogeland municipality in the Dutch province of Groningen. It had a population of around 475 in January 2017.

History
It was part of Kantens municipality before 1990, when it became part of Hefshuizen.

Gallery

References

External links 

Het Hogeland
Populated places in Groningen (province)